Summertime '57 and Summertime '58 is a Canadian music variety television series which aired on CBC Television in 1957 and 1958.

Premise
Bill Walker hosted Summertime '57 with the Jack Kane Orchestra. Summertime '58 featured a more diverse variety of musical guests. The series was a mid-year replacement for Jackie Rae'''s regular season variety show.

Scheduling
The Summertime series were broadcast in 30-minute timeslots.

Summertime '57Summertime '57 was broadcast on Thursdays at 9:30 p.m. (Eastern) from 27 June to 12 September 1957 as follows:

 27 June 1957: Peter Appleyard, Tommy Hunter, Selma Leeds, The Travellers
 4 July 1957: Bill Brady Quartet, Don Garrard, Evelyn Gould, Teddi King
 11 July 1957: Norm Amadio, Joan Fairfax, Anne Marie Moss, Brian Terry
 18 July 1957: Anne Gable, Larry O'Connor
 25 July 1957: Peter Appleyard, Tommy Hunter, Selma Leeds, The Travellers
 1 August 1957: Don Elliott, Joe Niosi (of The Happy Gang), Jimmy Shields, Gino Silvi vocal group, Rosalind Snow
 8 August 1957: Betty Jean Ferguson, Bernard Johnson, Ellis McClintock, The Playboys
 15 August 1957: William Charles, Helen Fielding, Wally Koster, Gerry Mulligan Quartet
 22 August 1957: Teddy Wilson
 29 August 1957: Betty Jean Ferguson, Don Garrard, Matt Matthews, The Playboys, Joe Puma
 5 September 1957: Martha Lou Harp
 12 September 1957: Tony Alamo, Betty Jean Ferguson, Bernard Johnson, Gino Silvi Quintet, Brian Terry

(Jack Kane band were regularly featured on episodes through this season)

Summertime '58Summertime '58'' was broadcast Thursdays at 8:00 p.m. from 10 July to 23 September 1958 as follows:

 10 July 1958: Joe Bushkin, Bobby Gimby, Moe Koffman, Anne Marie Moss
 17 July 1958: Bill Butler Trio, Helen Fielding
 24 July 1958: Trump Davidson, Maynard Ferguson, Jack Groob, The Triads
 31 July 1958: Duke Ellington Quintet, Bobby Gimby, Bert Ninsi Trio, Jean Ramsey
 7 August 1958: Murray Ginsberg (Dixieland Band), Ann Marie Moss, George Shearing Quintet, Wally Traugott Quartet
 14 August 1958: Carmen McRae Trio
 21 August 1958: Bill Butler, Helen Fielding, Jonah Jones Quartet, Jerry Toth
 28 August 1958: Bobby Gimby, Eddie Heywood, Cliff McKay (jazz), Ann Marie Moss
 4 September 1958: Ross Culley Group, Margo Lefevre, Modern Jazz Quartet, Billy O'Connor and his Leprecauhns
 11 September 1958: Tony Bradan Quintet, Dizzy Gillespie Quintet, Ann Marie Moss, Denny Vaughan
 18 September 1958: Bill Butler, Helen Fielding, The Four Freshmen, Jerry Toth Quintet
 23 September 1958: Bobby Gimby, Gene Krupa Trio, Ann Marie Moss (season finale)

References

External links
 

CBC Television original programming
1957 Canadian television series debuts
1958 Canadian television series endings
1950s Canadian variety television series
1950s Canadian music television series
Black-and-white Canadian television shows